The Tinetti Test (TT), or Performance Oriented Mobility Assessment (POMA) is a common clinical test for assessing a person's static and dynamic balance abilities. It is named after one of the inventors, Mary Tinetti.
The test is in two short sections that contain  one examining static balance abilities in a chair and then standing, and the other gait. The two sections are sometimes used as separate tests.

It has numerous other names, including Tinetti Gait and Balance Examination, Tinetti's Mobility Test, and Tinetti Balance Test; the wide variation in naming, test sections  and cut off values sometimes cause confusion.

See also
 Timed Up and Go test

References

External links
 Free online Tinetti Test calculator

Biomechanics
Medical scales
Geriatrics